Rhinosardinia bahiensis, commonly known as the Bahia spat, is a ray-finned fish in the family Clupeidae. It is found in South America, residing in freshwater, brackish, and pelagic environments in a tropical climate. It has 13 to 21 dorsal soft rays, 15 to 18 anal soft rays, and 43 vertebrae.

References

Clupeidae
Taxa named by Franz Steindachner
Fish described in 1879